Treece may refer to:

 Treece, Kansas, a small town in the United States
 Chuck Treece, session musician and professional skateboarder
 Henry Treece, poet and writer (now known mainly for his historical novels)

See also
 Trece